Riverside Cemetery is a cemetery located in West Norriton Township, Montgomery County, Pennsylvania, United States, near the western edge of Norristown, Pennsylvania. It was established in 1894.

Notable interments
 William Jordan Bolton (1833–1906), Brevet Brigadier General in American Civil War. Commander of the 51st Pennsylvania Infantry Regiment
 Roy Thomas (1874–1959), Major League Baseball Player.
 Lloyd H. Wood (1896–1964), 20th Lieutenant Governor of Pennsylvania from 1951 to 1955

See also
 Montgomery Cemetery (West Norriton Township, Pennsylvania) – the historic cemetery which adjoins Riverside Cemetery

References

External links
 
 Riverside Cemetery at Interment.net
 

Cemeteries in Montgomery County, Pennsylvania
1894 establishments in Pennsylvania